Quararibea aurantiocalyx is a species of flowering plant in the family Malvaceae. It is found in Costa Rica and Panama. It is threatened by habitat loss.

References

aurantiocalyx
Flora of Costa Rica
Flora of Panama
Endangered flora of North America
Taxonomy articles created by Polbot